Petter Olson (born 14 February 1991) is a Swedish athlete competing in the combined events. He won the silver medal at the 2009 European Junior Championships. As a senior, he competed at one outdoor and two indoor European Championships.

He also sometimes competes in the 400 metres hurdles, twice becoming the Swedish champion in that event.

Competition record

Personal bests

Outdoor
100 metres – 10.70 (+1.9 m/s) (Ribeira Brava 2014)
200 metres – 22.04 (+1.3 m/s) (Karlstad 2011)
400 metres – 48.36 (Ostrava 2011)
1500 metres – 4:26.29 (Ostrava 2011)
110 metres hurdles – 14.39 (-1.5 m/s) (Ribeira Brava 2014)
400 metres hurdles – 52.62 (Stockholm 2014)
High jump – 2.00 (Götzis 2010)
Pole vault – 5.05 (Helsinki 2008)
Long jump – 7.19 (+0.4 m/s) (Ribeira Brava 2014)
Shot put – 13.60 (Austin 2012)
Discus throw – 41.29 (Des Moines 2012)
Javelin throw – 57.13 (Austin 2012)
Decathlon – 7857 (Austin 2012)
Indoor
60 metres – 6.98 (Gothenburg 2013)
1000 metres – 2:39.97 (Nampa 2012)
60 metres hurdles – 8.06 (Norrköping 2015)
High jump – 2.02 (Norrköping 2011)
Pole vault – 5.14 (Västerås 2009)
Long jump – 7.13 (Nampa 2012)
Shot put – 14.19 (Växjö 2014)
Heptathlon – 5904 (Växjö 2014)

References

1991 births
Living people
Swedish decathletes
Swedish male hurdlers
Texas Longhorns men's track and field athletes